Tsuruya (鶴屋) can refer to:
Haruhi Suzumiya series character, see Tsuruya
Tsuruya Golf, see Tsuruya Open
Matsuya (department store), originally named Tsuruya